Tyrrheniellina is a genus of land snails, terrestrial pulmonate gastropod molluscs in the family Canariellidae.

Species 
Species in the genus Tyrrheniellina include:
 Tyrrheniellina josephi

References

 Giusti, F. & Manganelli, G. (1989). Notulae Malacologicae, XLIV. A new Hygromiidae from the Tyrrhenian islands of Capraia and Sardinia with notes on the genera Xeromicra and Xerotricha (Pulmonata: Helicoidea) (Studies on the Sardinian and Corsican malacofauna, VIII). Bollettino Malacologico, 25 (1/4): 23-62. Milano 
 Bank, R. A. (2017). Classification of the Recent terrestrial Gastropoda of the World. Last update: July 16th, 2017

External links
 AnimalBase info on this genus

 
Canariellidae
Taxonomy articles created by Polbot